Lubov Chernukhin (née Golubeva; born 12 November 1972) is a former investment banker born in the USSR. She is the largest female political donor in British history having donated over £2 million to the Conservative Party. Chernukhin writes columns for Reaction.life.

Biography 
Chernukhin left the USSR for the USA as a teenager. She was educated on the U.S. East Coast, receiving a master’s degree from the NYU Stern School of Business. Chernukhin moved to the UK in 1999. Aside from her philanthropic work, Chernukhin acts as a VC Investor and is listed as a director of UK property firm Capital Construction And Development Ltd.

In 2007, she married Vladimir Chernukhin, former deputy minister of finance in Mikhail Kasyanov’s government and former chairman of Russian state development corporation Vnesheconombank. In 2004, Vladimir was forced to flee to the UK from Russia after President Putin dismissed Prime Minister Kasyanov and began campaign of harassment against his associates. During 2021–2022 Russo-Ukrainian crisis, in reaction to 2022 Russian invasion of Ukraine, Chernukhin publicly condemned "all Russian military aggression in Ukraine" and urged for the "strongest possible sanctions against Putin's regime and its enablers". In September 2022, Chernukhin wrote an Op-ed on Politico regarding what avenue the west should take in relation to 2022 Russian invasion of Ukraine, in order to fight the war fatigue and what the media's role should be to support Ukraine.

In November 2022, Chernukhin together with entertainment entrepreneur Graham Owen opened a family entertainment centre, Owens Entertainment in Hastings, which has been built in place of a former Debenhams store with the aim of repurposing the site.

British Conservative Party 
Chernukhin is a member of the Conservative Party's Advisory Board for significant donors. In a February 2022 investigation The Times alleged that Chernukhin had repeatedly lobbied government ministers "against raising the tax burden on high net-worth individuals" and sent ministers research from Ernst and Young "on the importance of the ultra-rich for the overall economy" while a member of the advisory board.

Chernukhin's donations to the Conservative Party came under scrutiny after her husband was given a loan of $8 million by Russian billionaire Suleyman Kerimov through an offshore company in 2016. The transaction was first mentioned in FinCEN files leak which was reported by BBC News. The loan amount from Kerimov was subsequently repaid in the same year. Records from the Electoral Commission, show Chernukhin did make two donations to the Conservative Party during this time (from the date of loan receipt to the date of repayment), one in the sum of £1,100 and another in the sum of £4,000. According to BBC News, Chernukhin's lawyer stated that she "has never received money deriving from Mr Kerimov or any company related to him" and her "donations to the Conservative Party have never been tainted by Kremlin or any other influence".

References 

1972 births
Living people
Russian emigrants to the United Kingdom
Naturalised citizens of the United Kingdom
Russian bankers
Russian interference in British politics
Russian businesspeople in the United Kingdom